Sifap ("stroke in young Fabry patients") is a Pan-European study dedicated to investigating the correlation of juvenile stroke and a genetic disorder known as Fabry's disease. It was initiated by University of Rostock, Germany. In recruiting 5,000 patients aged 18 to 55 it will be the largest study on stroke in the young. Approximately 50 study centres from about 15 European countries are participating in the project. The study is divided into two parts: sifap1 and sifap2. Whereas sifap1 analyses the frequency of Fabry disease within the patient cohort, sifap2 controls and investigates the rehabilitation phase of diagnosed Fabry patients.

Background
The goal of the study is to show that Fabry disease has to be considered to be one of the most frequent genetic causes of juvenile stroke. To date the frequency of Fabry disease among general population has been estimated to be around 1:40,000. However, recent investigations have shown that Fabry disease can occur in 1 of 83 stroke patients aged 18–55 and between 1 of 3,500 to 1 of 4,500 individuals of the general population. Sifap aims at scientifically testing and supporting these findings.

Progress
After the proof-of-principle phase (April to December 2007) the official start of the study was January 1, 2008. Sifap1 patients were recruited until June 30, 2009. Sifap2 runs simultaneously, and is scheduled to conclude on June 30, 2012.

Technique

One of sifap’s unique characteristics is the fully automated analysis and storage of specimens in combination with the complete digital and web-based data handling. A pipetting robot extracts DNA from specimens and analyses them for Fabry disease. Afterwards, specimens are automatically stored in a biobank and consequently are available for future investigations.

Committees
In order to control, advise and establish professional structures two committees were formed. Publication issues and sifap basics are the responsibility of the steering committee. The nine members are: Miron Ginsberg (Miami, USA), Michael Hennerici (Mannheim, Germany), Christof Kessler (Greifswald, Germany), Edwin Kolodny (New York, USA), Peter Martus (Berlin, Germany), Bo Norrving (Lund, Sweden), Erich-Bernd Ringelstein (Münster, Germany), Peter Rothwell (Oxford, UK) and Graham Vanables (Sheffield, UK)
The biobank committee oversees the administration of stored specimens and decides in formal meetings on proposed new projects. The biobank committee consists of: Natan Bornstein (Tel Aviv, Israel), Peter Paul DeDeyn (Antwerp, Belgium), Martin Dichgans (Munich, Germany), Franz Fazekas (Graz, Austria), Hugh Markus (London, UK), Olaf Rieß (Tübingen, Germany) and Arndt Rolfs (Rostock, Germany). Imaging analysis was centrally performed at the Department of Neurology of the Medical University of Graz, coordinated by Franz Fazekas.

Participating Centres

External links
 http://www.sifap.de

Literature
 Rolfs et al. "Prevalence of Fabry disease in patients with cryptogenic stroke: a prospective study", The Lancet, Vol 366, 2005
 Spada et al. "High Incidence of Later-Onset Fabry Disease Revealed by Newborn Screening", The American Journal of Human Genetics, Vol 79, 2006

References

Evidence-based medicine

fr:Sifap